"Stop, Listen, Look & Think" is a song by the American girl group Exposé. It was written and produced by the group's founder, Lewis Martineé, and can be found on their 1989 second album, What You Don't Know. It was the first single released by Exposé to feature Ann Curless on lead vocals.
The song was also included on the soundtrack to the Lambada-themed film The Forbidden Dance, which was released in the U.S. in March 1990. 

Allmusic states that "Stop, Listen, Look & Think" is one of the best tracks on What You Don't Know and describes it as "a subtler uptempo number with an understated yet memorable lead by" Curless.

Reception
The single for "Stop, Listen, Look & Think" was remixed and issued as a promotional 12" single to nightclubs in the U.S. The song peaked at #19 on the Billboard Hot Dance Club Play chart in December 1990, the group's seventh entry on this survey.

Track listing
A1 - "Stop, Listen, Look & Think" House Mix (7:36)
A2 - "Stop, Listen, Look & Think" Dub Mix (5:17)
B1 - "Stop, Listen, Look & Think" Deep Thought Mix (5:49)
B2 - "Stop, Listen, Look & Think" L.A. Mix (6:23)

References

External links
"Stop, Listen, Look & Think" 12" promo info at discogs.com

1990 singles
Exposé (group) songs
Songs written by Lewis Martineé
1990 songs
Arista Records singles